First Racing (sometimes written as FIRST Racing) was an Italian motor racing team founded by Lamberto Leoni, which competed in International Formula 3000 from 1987 to 1991 and the Italian Formula 3 Championship in 1990.
The team built a car for entry into the 1989 Formula One series, designed by Richard Divila, and powered by a Judd V8 engine. Italian Gabriele Tarquini was signed to drive the lone entry, giving it a run at the 1989 Attilio Bettega Memorial event in Bologna   and the Formula One Indoor Trophy. However, the chassis itself was poorly manufactured due to a temperature mistake in the autoclave, with the result that a second chassis had to be re-commissioned. Having realized that the delay would cost the team a penalty for missing the first two races of the season, Divila and his engineers tried to reinforce the chassis with injections of a material called Redus 410 NA. Although the car passed the mandatory FIA pre-season crash test in Cranfield, it was now significantly overweight. Divila himself claimed that the car as it was, was good for nothing but being "an interesting flowerpot". Faced with the perspective of racing an uncompetitive car in a packed field (the 1989 Formula One World Championship counted over forty participants with pre-qualifying sessions), Leoni decided to withdraw before the opening Brazilian Grand Prix and concentrate his efforts on the Formula 3000 season; the effort lasted until 1991.

The second chassis commissioned by Leoni would be later purchased by Ernesto Vita and used in the 1990 Formula One World Championship for his Life L190.

Competition record

Complete Formula 3000 results

† Éric Hélary finished season with Cobra Racing

References

Article on the First 189 with photos (archived, in Italian)

Formula One constructors
Italian racecar constructors
International Formula 3000 teams